This is a list of drag kings, sometimes known as male impersonators, drag performers, or drag artists. A drag king is a person, who dresses in masculine clothes and hides their regular features (through such things as breast binding) for special occasions, often to perform, entertain, or engage in social activism. Many, but not all, drag kings are members of the LGBTQ+ community.

Performers

See also
List of drag queens
List of drag groups
Lesburlesque

References

External links
 List of Drag Performers archived link at draglistings.com

Drag (clothing)-related lists

kings